Krabbesund is a village in Risør municipality in Agder county, Norway. The village is located, along the Skaggerak coast, just south of the village of Fie.

References

Villages in Agder
Risør